College of New Jersey may refer to:

 College of New Jersey (18th Century), the original name of Princeton University
 The College of New Jersey, a public university in Ewing Township, New Jersey, United States